The Director of the Intelligence Bureau (DIB) is the chief executive of the Intelligence Bureau, India's premier domestic-intelligence agency. The DIB is the senior-most Indian Police Service officer of India. The current director of Intelligence Bureau is Tapan Deka, who is serving since 1 July 2022

Authority
Director IB (DIB) is a member of the Strategic Policy Group and the Joint Intelligence Committee (JIC), but intelligence inputs go through the regular channels in the Ministry of Home Affairs to the JIC. DIB reports to Union Home Secretary in the Union Ministry of Home affairs, GoI.

List of Directors of the Intelligence Bureau
The following is the list of Director of Intelligence Bureau.

References

Four-star officers
Intelligence Bureau (India)
Police ranks of India